Mamadou Drame (born 18 April 1954) is a Senegalese boxer. He competed in the men's heavyweight event at the 1976 Summer Olympics where he finished in joint 9th place.

References

1954 births
Living people
Senegalese male boxers
Olympic boxers of Senegal
Boxers at the 1976 Summer Olympics
Place of birth missing (living people)
Heavyweight boxers